Nikolay Stoyanov Boshnakov (Bulgarian: Николай Стоянов Бошнаков) (3 April 1911 – 16 August 1948) was a Bulgarian officer, flying ace and participant in World War II (1941 - 1945).

Biography 
Boshnakov was born on April 3, 1911, in Pleven. In 1933, he graduated from Military School and on September 6 he was promoted to the rank of second lieutenant and appointed to military service at Fourth Pleven Regiment. Later he graduated from the Kazanlak school for the training of pilots. In 1937, he joined the Bulgarian Air Force.

Boshnakov was appointed as commander of Wing 2/6 and he relocated to Vrazhdebna airport where he was in charge of directly defending Bulgaria's capital Sofia. As a commander and fighter-pilot he took part in seven air battles, with four victories. After being wounded in battle he saved his life by catapulting.

References

Bulgarian aviators
World War II pilots
Bulgarian Air Force personnel
1911 births
1948 deaths
People from Pleven
Recipients of the Order of Bravery
Bulgarian World War II flying aces
20th-century Bulgarian military personnel